Sen. Helvídio Nunes Airport  is the airport serving Picos, Brazil. The airport is named after Helvídio Nunes de Barros (1925–2000), former mayor of Picos, Governor of Piauí and Senator.

It is operated by Esaero.

History
In 2011 the airport was renovated.

Airlines and destinations
No scheduled flights operate at this airport.

Access

See also

List of airports in Brazil

References

External links

Airports in Piauí